The 1996 PBA season was the 22nd season of the Philippine Basketball Association (PBA).

Board of governors

Executive committee
 Jun Bernardino (Commissioner) 
 Teodoro L. Dimayuga (Chairman, representing Purefoods TJ Hotdogs)
 Nazario L. Avendaño (Vice-Chairman, representing San Miguel Beermen)
 Dr. Antonio V. Concepcion (Treasurer, representing Ginebra San Miguel)

Teams

Season highlights
The league's broadcast partner, Vintage Sports, switched networks from People's Television to Intercontinental Broadcasting Corporation. They also changed their primary language from English to Tagalog.
Crowd-favorite Ginebra San Miguel return to their winning ways after years of being a doormat with the entry of top draft pick, 6-9 Marlou Aquino, the Ginebras advances in the semifinals for the first time in three years during the All-Filipino Cup, their season was highlighted by a finals trip in the third conference, losing to grandslam champions Alaska Milkmen. 
The Pepsi Mega Bottlers sold their franchise to PILTEL and was renamed Mobiline Cellulars at the start of the Commissioner's Cup.
The Alaska Milkmen became the fourth team to win the PBA Grand slam by sweeping all three conferences of the season, joining the 1976 and 1983 Crispa Redmanizers and the 1989 San Miguel Beermen. 
Johnny Abarrientos became the first pure guard to win the Most Valuable Player (MVP) award since Ricardo Brown in 1985.

Opening ceremonies
The muses for the participating teams are as follows:

Champions
 All-Filipino Cup: Alaska Milkmen
 Commissioner's Cup: Alaska Milkmen
 Governor's Cup: Alaska Milkmen
 Team with best win–loss percentage: Alaska Milkmen (51-21, .708)
 Best Team of the Year: Alaska Milkmen (1st)

All-Filipino Cup

Elimination round

Semifinal round

Third place playoff 

|}

Finals

|}
Finals MVP: Jojo Lastimosa (Alaska)
Best Player of the Conference: Alvin Patrimonio (Purefoods)

Commissioner's Cup

Elimination round

Semifinal round

Third place playoff 

|}

Finals

|}
Finals MVP: Bong Hawkins (Alaska)
Best Player of the Conference: Bong Hawkins (Alaska)
Best Import of the Conference: Ken Redfield (Formula Shell)

Governors' Cup

Elimination round

Playoffs

Finals

|}
Finals MVP: Johnny Abarrientos (Alaska)
Best Player of the Conference: Marlou Aquino (Ginebra)
Best Import of the Conference: Sean Chambers (Alaska)

Awards
 Most Valuable Player: Johnny Abarrientos (Alaska)
 Rookie of the Year:  Marlou Aquino (Ginebra)
 Sportsmanship Award: Jerry Codiñera (Purefoods)
 Most Improved Player: Edward "Poch" Juinio (Alaska)
 Defensive Player of the Year: Marlou Aquino (Ginebra)
 Mythical Five: 
Johnny Abarrientos (Alaska) 
Rene Hawkins, Jr. (Alaska)
Jojo Lastimosa (Alaska)
Alvin Patrimonio (Purefoods)
Marlou Aquino (Ginebra)
 Mythical Second Team: 
Bal David (Ginebra)
Noli Locsin (Ginebra)
Jeffrey Cariaso (Alaska)
Benjie Paras (Shell)
Nelson Asaytono (San Miguel)
 All Defensive Team: 
Jerry Codiñera (Purefoods) 
Chris Jackson (Sta. Lucia) 
Johnny Abarrientos (Alaska) 
Jeffrey Cariaso (Alaska)
Marlou Aquino (Ginebra)

Awards given by the PBA Press Corps
 Coach of the Year: Tim Cone (Alaska)
 Mr. Quality Minutes: Gilbert "Jun" Reyes, Jr. (Alaska)
 Executive of the Year: Jun Bernardino (PBA Commissioner)
 Comeback Player of the Year: Richie Ticzon (Shell)
 Referee of the Year: Ogie Bernarte

Cumulative standings

References

 
PBA